Willoughby Waterleys Cricket Club is an amateur cricket club that up until recently was based at Dunton Bassett Cricket Club, Dunton Bassett, Leicestershire.

Ground
Willoughby Waterleys CC home ground was on Dunton Bassett Cricket Club, Lutterworth Road, due east of Dunton Bassett village from the early 1990s to 2015.

History
Cricket in Willoughby Waterleys (formerly known as Willoughby Waterless) dates back to at least the late 19th century. When "Willoughby Waterless Cricket Club" took part in the Lutterworth & District Village Cricket Challenge Cup, between 1922 and 1939 they won the Challenge Cup 5 times. However, after the Second World War, the club focused on friendly matches and at some point ceased activity, until the Queen's Silver Jubilee year of 1977 when the club was reformed using the modern spelling of Willoughby Waterleys, in response to a challenge to a match from the neighbouring village of Ashby Magna. 
After a brief spell on a field off Ashby Lane, the new club's ground was based on land next to West End Farm, Gilmorton Lane. When the owner of the farm moved to Nickle's Farm, the club followed. By 1990, the Club moved away from the field and rented space at the Dunton Bassett Cricket Club ground; and continued to play successful cricket as a friendly XI side. However, in 2015, the club struggled to sustain enough players to form a team and as a result decided to suspend activity.

Club performance
The nearest Sunday leagues in Leicestershire were too far away for the Club to travel (Grantham and Melton Cricket Association and the Rutland and District Cricket League) and like so many other clubs in the region, they had to make their own arrangements. This allowed a level of freedom for the team to explore a wider choice of clubs and grounds in and around South Leicestershire, and there were frequent matches with neighbouring teams: Arnesby, Fleckney Village, Gumley, Harborough South, Laughton and Mowsley, Wigston Town, etc. They also organised annual tours the length and breadth of Great Britain (e.g. Bristol - Bishopston North Wales - Maeshafn etc.)
Evidence shows that the standard of play proved to be very high (See fixture and results table for 2014 below).

Club honours

See also
Club cricket

References

External links
 Memories of Willoughby Waterleys Cricket Club. With Alex Hunter, John Harris and Peter Fletcher.
 Lutterworth & District Village Cricket Challenge Cup Winners
 Willoughby Waterleys Cricket Club Facebook page
 Willoughby Waterleys Cricket Club flickr page

English club cricket teams
Cricket in Leicestershire
1977 establishments in England
Club cricket